Cedar Grove is a town in Kanawha County, West Virginia, United States. The population was 714 at the 2020 census. Cedar Grove was incorporated in 1902. Its name is derived from the time the town was established, when a large juniper forest, misidentified as cedars by early settlers, was growing at that location. Cedar Grove is the site of Fort Kelley and the oldest settlement in the Kanawha Valley, dating from 1773. Landmarks located here include the Tompkins Home (1844) and the Old Brick Church (1853). The current mayor is James Hudnall.

Geography
Cedar Grove is located at  (38.220096, -81.429449).

Demographics

2010 census
As of the census of 2010, there were 997 people, 400 households, and 279 families living in the town. The racial makeup of the town was 96.6% White, 1.4% African American, 0.2% Native American, 0.1% Asian, 0.2% from other races, and 1.5% from two or more races. Hispanic or Latino of any race were 0.9% of the population.

There were 400 households, of which 34.3% had children under the age of 18 living with them, 46.5% were married couples living together, 16.5% had a female householder with no husband present, 6.8% had a male householder with no wife present, and 30.3% were non-families. 26.0% of all households were made up of individuals, and 15.8% had someone living alone who was 65 years of age or older. The average household size was 2.48 and the average family size was 2.97.

The median age in the town was 39.4 years. 25.1% of residents were under the age of 18; 6.8% were between the ages of 18 and 24; 25% were from 25 to 44; 27% were from 45 to 64; and 15.8% were 65 years of age or older. The gender makeup of the town was 46.4% male and 53.6% female.

2000 census
As of the census of 2000, there were 862 people, 368 households, and 241 families living in the town. The population density was 1,143.8 inhabitants per square mile (443.8/km2). There were 408 housing units at an average density of 541.4 per square mile (210.0/km2). The racial makeup of the town was 98.72% White, 0.93% African American, and 0.35% from two or more races. Hispanic or Latino of any race were 0.23% of the population.

There were 368 households, out of which 28.5% had children under the age of 18 living with them, 42.7% were married couples living together, 15.8% had a female householder with no husband present, and 34.5% were non-families. 31.5% of all households were made up of individuals, and 18.2% had someone living alone who was 65 years of age or older. The average household size was 2.33 and the average family size was 2.90.

In the town, the population was spread out, with 21.6% under the age of 18, 9.7% from 18 to 24, 25.9% from 25 to 44, 21.8% from 45 to 64, and 21.0% who were 65 years of age or older. The median age was 40 years. For every 100 females, there were 90.7 males. For every 100 females age 18 and over, there were 86.7 males.

The median income for a household in the town was $23,250, and the median income for a family was $27,604. Males had a median income of $27,361 versus $22,222 for females. The per capita income for the town was $12,911. About 23.2% of families and 22.9% of the population were below the poverty line, including 30.1% of those under age 18 and 7.9% of those age 65 or over.

Things to do in Cedar Grove

Cedar Grove offers non-handicap fishing access behind Cedar Grove Community School, as well as a park for the youth to play.

Utilities in Cedar Grove

The town of Cedar Grove supplies residents with trash pickup. Electricity for the area is supplied by Appalachian Electric and Power (AEP). Cable services are supplied by Suddenlink Communications, and various satellite providers are available in the area. Cedar Grove Fire Department is volunteer based, with paid emergency medical technicians on the ambulance service.

References

Towns in Kanawha County, West Virginia
Towns in West Virginia
Populated places on the Kanawha River
Charleston, West Virginia metropolitan area
Populated places established in 1902
Coal towns in West Virginia
1902 establishments in West Virginia